Parkland  is a 2013 American historical drama film that recounts the chaotic events that occurred following the 1963 assassination of John F. Kennedy. The film was written and directed by Peter Landesman, and produced by Playtone's Tom Hanks and Gary Goetzman, Bill Paxton, and Exclusive Media's Nigel and Matt Sinclair. The film is based on Vincent Bugliosi's 2008 book Four Days in November: The Assassination of President John F. Kennedy.

Plot 
Parkland weaves together the perspectives of a handful of ordinary individuals suddenly thrust into extraordinary circumstances: the young doctors and nurses at Parkland Hospital; Dallas's chief of the Secret Service; a bystander who captured what became the most famous home movie in history; the FBI agents who were visited by Lee Harvey Oswald before the shooting; the brother of Oswald, left to deal with his shattered family; and JFK's security team, witnesses to both the president's death and Vice President Lyndon Johnson's succession to office.

Cast
 James Badge Dale as Robert Edward Lee Oswald Jr.
 Zac Efron as Dr. Charles James "Jim" Carrico 
 Jackie Earle Haley as Father Oscar Huber
 Tom Welling as Secret Service Agent Roy Kellerman
 Colin Hanks as Dr. Malcolm O. Perry
 David Harbour as James Gordon Shanklin
 Marcia Gay Harden as Head Nurse Doris Nelson
 Ron Livingston as James P. Hosty
 Jeremy Strong as Lee Harvey Oswald
 Billy Bob Thornton as Secret Service Agent Forrest Sorrels
 Jacki Weaver as Marguerite Oswald
 Paul Giamatti as Abraham Zapruder
 Dana Wheeler-Nicholson as Lillian Zapruder
 Bitsie Tulloch as Marilyn Sitzman
 Brett Stimely as the corpse of President John F. Kennedy
 Kat Steffens as First Lady Jacqueline Kennedy
 Gil Bellows as David Powers
 Sean McGraw as President Lyndon B. Johnson
 Rory Cochrane as Earl Rose
 Mark Duplass as Kenneth O'Donnell
 Jimmie Dale Gilmore as Reverend Saunders
 Matt Barr as Paul Mikkelson
 Jonathan Breck as Winston Lawson
 Gary Grubbs as Dr. Kemp Clark
 Bryan Batt as Malcolm Kilduff
 Glenn Morshower as Mike Howard
 Armando Gutierrez as Officer Glen McBride
 Austin Nichols as Secret Service Agent Emory Roberts
 Gary Clarke as Admiral George Burkley

Production
Production began in January 2013 in Austin, Texas. Writer/director Peter Landesman has stated that the film does not explore the various conspiracy theories surrounding the Kennedy assassination.

The major hospital scenes were filmed in a building housed on the campus of Austin State Hospital in Austin, due to the period look and feel of the building.

Release
Parkland premiered at the 70th Venice International Film Festival, and was also screened at the 2013 Toronto International Film Festival. Coinciding with the assassination's 50th anniversary year, the film was released theatrically in the United States on October 4, 2013.

Reception
Parkland received mixed reviews, holding a 50% rating, based on 123 reviews, on review aggregator website Rotten Tomatoes; the consensus states: "Although its decision to look at John F. Kennedy's assassination through uncommon perspectives is refreshing, Parkland never achieves the narrative cohesion its subject deserves." On Metacritic, the film has a 51/100 rating, signifying "mixed or average reviews".

Home media
The film was released on DVD and Blu-ray on November 5, 2013.

Historical accuracy
Historian Peter Ling awarded Parkland four out of five stars for enjoyment and three stars for historical accuracy. Reviewing the film, he praised its attempt to "capture the desperate efforts made to save Kennedy in the operating room." He told historyextra, "It shows that the head nurse, Doris Nelson (played by Marcia Gay Harden), had to take a piece of JFK's skull and some brain tissue from Mrs Kennedy [Jackie picked up a piece of her husband's skull at the scene], and that junior doctor, Jim Carrico (played by Zac Efron), had to be told to stop the frenetic but fruitless cardiac massage at one o'clock, when the team declared JFK dead."

However, he claimed there may have been "suspect influences" on Abraham Zapruder's decision to hand over his film to Life magazine. He said, "Once copies have been given to the Secret Service and the FBI, Zapruder has to choose from many media outlets who want to buy the film. He chooses Life because he says he respects the publication, but the movie seems to hint that any suppression of the film's contents is in line with Zapruder's wishes, and not because of suspect influences at Life itself, whose managing director [C D Jackson] had CIA connections."

See also
 Killing Kennedy (2013), a made-for-TV film about the same events, also commemorating the 50th anniversary of the JFK assassination.
 Bobby (2006), a film detailing events, some fictional, around the RFK assassination, directed by Emilio Estevez.

References

External links
 
 
 
 
 
 
 Lefowitz, Barbara F. (December 2013). "The Pink Suit". Portland Monthly p. 43

2013 films
2010s political drama films
American independent films
American political drama films
Films scored by James Newton Howard
Films about the assassination of John F. Kennedy
Films based on non-fiction books
Films set in 1963
Films set in Dallas
Films set in Washington, D.C.
Films shot in Austin, Texas
Films shot in Dallas
Films set in hospitals
Playtone films
Exclusive Media films
2013 directorial debut films
Films directed by Peter Landesman
Films produced by Gary Goetzman
Films with screenplays by Peter Landesman
Films based on works by Vincent Bugliosi
Cultural depictions of John F. Kennedy
Cultural depictions of Robert F. Kennedy
Cultural depictions of Lee Harvey Oswald
Cultural depictions of Lyndon B. Johnson
2013 drama films
2010s English-language films
2010s American films